Minfla is a village in central Ivory Coast. It is in the sub-prefecture of Zuénoula, Zuénoula Department, Marahoué Region, Sassandra-Marahoué District.

Minfla was a commune until March 2012, when it became one of 1126 communes nationwide that were abolished.

Notes

Former communes of Ivory Coast
Populated places in Sassandra-Marahoué District
Populated places in Marahoué